Schmemann can refer to :

Alexander Schmemann (1921–1983), Orthodox Christian priest, teacher, and writer
Serge Schmemann (born 1945), French journalist